The term Anti-Eastern may refer to:

 Anti-Middle Eastern sentiment, negative sentiments and animosities towards people from the Middle East
 Anti-Eastern Orthodox sentiment, negative sentiments and animosities towards Eastern Orthodox Christianity
 opposition to any other notion related to East (mainly in cultural, religious, ethnic or some other terms)

See also
 
 Anti-Western (disambiguation)